was a samurai, bureaucrat, politician, entrepreneur and social activist in the late Meiji and Taishō period Empire of Japan. He is noted as one of the more progressive figures of the early Meiji period, although his record is complex. His wife was the younger daughter of Gotō Shōjirō.

Biography
Ōe was born in Hata District, Tosa Domain, what is now Ōtsuki, Kōchi. He grew up in Nagasaki, but towards the end of the Bakumatsu period returned to his native Tosa to join the Rikuentai, a paramilitary group of Tosa samurai supporting the Sonnō jōi movement and dedicated to the overthrow of the Tokugawa shogunate. His fellow members included Sakamoto Ryōma, Nakaoka Shintarō and Mutsu Munemitsu. In 1868, he participated in an attack against the foreign consulates in Kobe.

After the Meiji Restoration, Ōe left Tosa for Tokyo in 1871 and joined the new Meiji government. Somewhat ironically for his xenophobic background, he was assigned as a judge to assist Mutsu Munemitsu (who had been appointed governor of Kanagawa Prefecture) in the management of foreign affairs at the port of Yokohama. Ōe played a central role in the María Luz Incident, in which the Japanese government took steps to rescue 232 Chinese indentured laborers from a Peruvian ship, over the vehement protests by the Western nations. The incident also led to legislation in 1872, emancipating burakumin outcasts, prostitutes and other forms of bonded labor in Japan.

In 1877, Ōe returned to Tosa, in an attempt to encourage his countrymen to rise up against the central government in support of the Satsuma Rebellion. After the failure of the rebellion, he was arrested for treason, and sentenced to twelve years in prison.

Ōe returned to Tokyo in 1890, having been elected a member of the lower house in the Diet of Japan in the 1890 General Election as one of the founding members of the Liberal Party. He spoke out strongly against increasing government corruption, and the ever increasing military expenditures. He left the government in 1892 to become President of the Tokyo Stock Exchange. In 1899, he became one of the founders of the Keifu Railway Company, which aimed at establishing a railway connecting the Korean capital of Seoul with the southern port city of Busan.

However, in 1914, Ōe retired from all business and political activities, took the tonsure and became a Buddhist priest of the Sōtō Zen sect, and traveled around the country. In his final years, he became an outspoken proponent of ending all discrimination with regards to the burakumin outcasts. He died of stomach cancer in 1921; his grave was at the Aoyama Cemetery in Tokyo.

References

 Botsman, Daniel V. Reform, Rebellion, and Imperialism: Political Conflict in 1870s Japan. The Association for Asian Studies. Japan Session 12 (2008)

Notes

1847 births
1921 deaths
People from Kōchi Prefecture
People from Tosa Domain
Samurai
Meiji Restoration
People of Meiji-period Japan
Japanese rebels
Japanese Buddhist clergy
Deaths from stomach cancer
Deaths from cancer in Japan
Liberal Party (Japan, 1881) politicians
Members of the House of Representatives (Empire of Japan)
Governors of Kanagawa Prefecture